The 1940 Kansas City Monarchs baseball team represented the Kansas City Monarchs in the Negro American League (NAL) during the 1940 baseball season. The team compiled a 31–15–2 record and won the NAL pennant. 

The team featured three individuals who were later inducted into the Baseball Hall of Fame: manager Andy Cooper, center fielder Turkey Stearnes, and left fielder Willard Brown. 

The team's leading batters were:
 Shortstop Jesse Williams - .368 batting average, 24 RBIs in 31 games
 Third baseman Herb Souell - .340 batting average
 Buck O'Neil - .307 batting average, .447 slugging percentage, 30 RBIs in 31 games

The team's leading pitchers were Jack Matchett (6–2, 2.58 ERA) and Frank Bradley (4–1, 2.38 ERA).

References

1940 in sports in Missouri
Negro league baseball seasons
Kansas City Monarchs